Retrophyllum piresii is a species of conifer in the family Podocarpaceae. It is found only in Brazil.

References

Podocarpaceae
Data deficient plants
Taxonomy articles created by Polbot
Endemic flora of Brazil